Markus Palionis (born 12 May 1987) is a Lithuanian former professional footballer who played as a defender.

Career
Born in Kaunas in the former Soviet Union, Palionis grew up in Germany and holds a German passport.

On 9 October 2014, he joined SSV Jahn Regensburg. In March 2018, he agreed a contract extension until 2020 with the club.

Palionis retired from professional playing in summer 2021. After spending one season with Jahn Regensburg II he ended his playing career.

References

External links
 
 
 

1987 births
Living people
Lithuanian footballers
German footballers
Association football defenders
Lithuania youth international footballers
Lithuania under-21 international footballers
Lithuania international footballers
SV Wacker Burghausen players
Dynamo Dresden players
SC Paderborn 07 players
SSV Jahn Regensburg players
SSV Jahn Regensburg II players
2. Bundesliga players
3. Liga players
Regionalliga players
Lithuanian expatriate footballers
Lithuanian expatriate sportspeople in Germany
Expatriate footballers in Germany